Purandara may refer to:

Purandara (philosopher), a 7th-century Cārvāka philosopher
Purandara Dasa, a 16th-century musician